Akademiya Navuk (lit. Academy of Sciences) is a station on the Minsk Metro's Maskoŭskaja line. Named after the National Academy of Sciences of Belarus, which is located nearby, the station was opened along the first stage of the metro on 30 June 1984.

Designed by architects A.Zenzin and M.Pirogov, the station is a typical pillar-trispan consisting of two rows of concrete pillars, which are revetted with grey marble, and punctuated by stainless steel insets. In addition the station features contrasting white marbled walls and grey granite floor. Both vestibules have large artworks (work of V.Churilo and S.Sokolov).

The station has two underground vestibules, the western one is located on the intersection of the  Independence avenue with the Surganov street, and is linked to the stations by escalators. The eastern one also offers access to the "Oktyabr" cinema and the Academy itself.

In the future it is possible that this station will be a transfer point to the fourth line.

Gallery

External links 
 
 bymetro.narod.ru - Description.

Minsk Metro stations
Railway stations opened in 1984